Isostyla picata is a moth of the family Notodontidae first described by William Warren in 1900. It is found in Colombia and Ecuador.

References

Moths described in 1900
Notodontidae of South America